Andy Roddick was the defending champion and won in the final 7–6(9–7), 7–6(7–4) against Ivo Karlović.

Seeds
The top eight seeds received a bye to the second round.

Draw

Finals

Top half

Section 1

Section 2

Bottom half

Section 3

Section 4

References 
 2005 Stella Artois Championships Draw (Archived 2009-05-28)
 2005 Stella Artois Championships Qualifying Draw

Singles